Jean-Claude Billong (born 28 December 1993) is a professional footballer who plays as a centre-back for Liga I club CFR Cluj. Born in France, he represents the Cameroon national team.

Club career
Born in Paris, Billong played for youth selections of US Créteil-Lusitanos, and later moved to Mantes. In 2014, Billong moved abroad and signed for the reserve team of the New York Red Bulls. In July 2015, he signed for the Portuguese team Leixões.

In July 2016, he signed a one-year deal with Slovenian team Rudar Velenje. He made 24 appearances in the Slovenian PrvaLiga during the 2016–17 season, scoring two goals. In June 2017, he moved to Slovenian champions Maribor, signing a three-year contract. He made his debut for Maribor on 15 July 2017 in a match against Aluminij, where he played entire match.

In December 2017, Billong signed for the Serie A team Benevento for an undisclosed transfer fee, believed to be around €2 million.

On 31 January 2019, he joined Serie B club Foggia on loan.

On 15 July 2019, he signed a four-year contract with Serie B club Salernitana.

On 17 August 2021, he moved to Clermont in France on a two-year contract.

International career
Born in France, Billong is of Cameroonian descent. He debuted with the senior Cameroon national team in a 1–0 friendly win over Nigeria on 4 June 2021.

International stats

References

External links
 
 NZS profile 

1993 births
Living people
Footballers from Paris
Citizens of Cameroon through descent
Cameroonian footballers
Cameroon international footballers
French footballers
French sportspeople of Cameroonian descent
Association football defenders
French expatriate footballers
NK Rudar Velenje players
NK Maribor players
Benevento Calcio players
Calcio Foggia 1920 players
U.S. Salernitana 1919 players
Hatayspor footballers
Clermont Foot players
CFR Cluj players
Cameroonian expatriate sportspeople in the United States
Cameroonian expatriate sportspeople in Portugal
Cameroonian expatriate sportspeople in Slovenia
Cameroonian expatriate sportspeople in Italy
Cameroonian expatriate sportspeople in Turkey
Cameroonian expatriate sportspeople in Romania
French expatriate sportspeople in the United States
French expatriate sportspeople in Portugal
French expatriate sportspeople in Slovenia
French expatriate sportspeople in Italy
French expatriate sportspeople in Turkey
French expatriate sportspeople in Romania
Expatriate soccer players in the United States
Expatriate footballers in Portugal
Expatriate footballers in Slovenia
Expatriate footballers in Italy
Expatriate footballers in Turkey
Slovenian PrvaLiga players
Serie A players
Serie B players
Süper Lig players
Ligue 1 players
Liga I players